Santa Lucía is a city in the state of Miranda, Venezuela. It is the capital of Paz Castillo Municipality.

Cities in Miranda (state)